Javier Juliá is an Argentine film cinematographer and film editor.

Filmography
Cinematography
 Latidos (1993)
 Rubén, el murciélago (1993)
 Le molestaría si le hago una pregunta? (1994)
 Guarisove, los olvidados (1995)
 La Simple razón (1995)
 Mala época (1998)
 Los Libros y la noche (1999) a.k.a. The Books and the Night
 Película bruta (1999)
 El Descanso (2002)
 Cama Adentro (2004) a.k.a. Live-In Maid
 Iluminados por el fuego (2005) a.k.a. Blessed by Fire
La cordillera (2017)

Editing
 Cortázar (1994) a.k.a. Celestial Clockwork

Awards
 Argentine Film Critics Association Awards: Silver Condor Best Editing; for Cortázar; (1994).

References

External links
 

Argentine cinematographers
Living people
Year of birth missing (living people)
Place of birth missing (living people)